The 2016–17 Luxembourg National Division was the 103rd season of football in Luxembourg. The season started on 6 August 2016 and ended on 21 May 2017.

Teams
The following 3 clubs left the National Division before the season -
 FC Wiltz 71 – relegated to Luxembourg Division of Honour
 FC Etzella Ettelbruck – relegated to Luxembourg Division of Honour
 CS Grevenmacher – relegated to Luxembourg Division of Honour

The following 3 clubs joined the National Division before the season -
 UN Käerjeng 97 – promoted from Luxembourg Division of Honour
 Union Titus Pétange – promoted from Luxembourg Division of Honour
 FC Jeunesse Canach – promoted from Luxembourg Division of Honour

Source: Soccerway

League table

Results
Each team plays every other team in the league twice, home-and-away, for a total of 26 matches played each.

Relegation play-offs
A play-off (on neutral ground) was played between the twelfth-placed team in the 2016–17 Luxembourg National Division and the third-placed team in the 2016–17 Luxembourg Division of Honour for one place in the 2017–18 Luxembourg National Division.

Top goalscorers

See also
2016–17 Luxembourg Cup

References

External links

Luxembourg National Division seasons
1
Luxembourg